Najman is a surname. In Yiddish it is a variant of German language surname Neumann which means "new man". The surname is also used in Prelog, Croatia. People with the surname include:

 Dina Najman, American rabbi
 Dindar Najman, Iraqi politician
 Emil Najman (1907–1989), Croatian pediatrician 
 Hindy Najman, American scholar
 Maurice Najman, French journalist

References

Croatian surnames
Yiddish-language surnames